Papyrus Volume II is an album by American jazz trumpeter Bill Dixon recorded in 1998 and released on the Italian Soul Note label.

Reception

AllMusic awarded the album 3 stars.

The authors of The Penguin Guide to Jazz Recordings wrote: "There are moments when trumpeter and percussionist seem to be working on different ideas... And yet, there is such a stirring thoughtfulness to Dixon's spacious solo lines that the logic carries each piece forward to a satisfactory conclusion."

Track listing
All compositions by Bill Dixon except as indicated
 "Silver Point: Jeanne Phillips" - 1:32  
 "Papyrus #2" (Bill Dixon, Tony Oxley) - 12:13  
 "Pyxis" - 4:33  
 "Squares" - 7:07  
 "Epigraphy" - 8:19  
 "Sine Qua Non #2" - 6:34  
 "Couplet" - 5:20  
 "Four: VI: 1998" - 10:23  
 "Crawlspace" - 13:14  
 "Suri-Mono: Louise Wade" - 3:04

Personnel
Bill Dixon - trumpet, piano
Tony Oxley - drums, percussion

References 

2000 albums
Bill Dixon albums
Black Saint/Soul Note albums